Aliya Riaz (born 24 September 1992) is a Pakistani cricketer who plays as a right-handed batter and right-arm off break bowler for Pakistan. She has also played domestic cricket for Rawalpindi, Federal Capital, Higher Education Commission, Lahore, State Bank of Pakistan and Zarai Taraqiati Bank Limited.

International career
In October 2018, she was named in Pakistan's squad for the 2018 ICC Women's World Twenty20 tournament in the West Indies. She was the leading wicket-taker for Pakistan in the tournament, with six dismissals in four matches. In January 2020, she was named in Pakistan's squad for the 2020 ICC Women's T20 World Cup in Australia. In December 2020, she was shortlisted as one of the Women's Cricketer of the Year for the 2020 PCB Awards.

In October 2021, she was named in Pakistan's team for the 2021 Women's Cricket World Cup Qualifier tournament in Zimbabwe. In January 2022, she was named in Pakistan's team for the 2022 Women's Cricket World Cup in New Zealand. In May 2022, she was named in Pakistan's team for the cricket tournament at the 2022 Commonwealth Games in Birmingham, England.

References

External links
 
 

1992 births
Living people
Cricketers from Rawalpindi
Pakistani women cricketers
Pakistan women One Day International cricketers
Pakistan women Twenty20 International cricketers
Rawalpindi women cricketers
Federal Capital women cricketers
Higher Education Commission women cricketers
Lahore women cricketers
State Bank of Pakistan women cricketers
Zarai Taraqiati Bank Limited women cricketers
Asian Games medalists in cricket
Cricketers at the 2014 Asian Games
Asian Games gold medalists for Pakistan
Medalists at the 2014 Asian Games
Cricketers at the 2022 Commonwealth Games
Commonwealth Games competitors for Pakistan